Roger McKenzie (22 July 1971 – 25 November 1995) also known under his production aliases of Wildchild or DJ Wildchild, was an English musician and DJ.

Biography
Born in Southampton, England, he released many singles on labels such as Hi Life Recordings, Ultra Records and Polydor. The tracks "Jump to My Beat", "Renegade Master" (famously sampling "One for the Trouble" by A.D.O.R.) and the subsequent "Renegade Master '98" were his most successful.  Fatboy Slim's 1998 Old Skool Mix is perhaps the most famous version of "Renegade Master". "Renegade Master" was Wildchild's first hit single in 1995, peaking at No. 11 on the UK Singles Chart, but was surpassed by the success of Fatboy Slim's remix "Renegade Master '98", which peaked at No. 3 in 1998.

Just before his death at the age of 24 from an undiagnosed heart condition, McKenzie formed his own record label, Dark & Black. On 6 April 1996, his girlfriend Donna Snell gave birth to their son, Noir. His record label founded the Wildchild Music Foundation in his memory.

Chart singles

† These tracks were identical, despite their different titles
‡ Wildchild featuring Jamalski

References

External links

English electronic musicians
English DJs
English record producers
Black British musicians
1971 births
1995 deaths
Musicians from Southampton
20th-century English male musicians
Electronic dance music DJs
Polydor Records artists
Ultra Records artists